Huby is a village in the Harrogate district of North Yorkshire, England about five miles south-west of Harrogate.

The village is on the A658 between Otley and Harrogate. It is served by Weeton railway station on the line which links Leeds with Harrogate. A rocky outcrop known as Almscliffe Crag is about one mile north-west of the village; it is formed from millstone grit and is very popular with climbers and boulderers. The village has a Methodist chapel.

The Atkinson family, who lived in the village, are the focus of a 1978 book by Colin Gordon. It includes a family tree beginning with Henry Atkinson (1823–92) and Ellen Backhouse (1827–1908) along with many illustrations, rescued from photographic plates found on a market stall. The village is also the subject of a booklet by Joan Coombs.

The first mention of a post office in the village was in 1888. A telegram delivered from the post office in 1940, and a photograph of the post office, appeared as illustrations in an article in a British philatelic magazine in 1989, which recalled the contribution to the village provided by members of the Jackson family, including George Faulkes Jackson (1912–80), who served as postmaster and as clerk to the parish council. The post office closed in October 1995.

References

Villages in North Yorkshire